Clear Lake is the name of several lakes in the U.S. state of Michigan:

*Note on lakes that span more than one county: The county column only shows the first county returned by GNIS in this column.

References 

Clear Lake
Clear